Eupithecia perfusca is a moth in the family Geometridae first described by George Duryea Hulst in 1898. It is found in western North America.

The wingspan is about 21 mm.

The larvae feed on Salix, Alnus and Betula species.

References

Moths described in 1898
perfusca
Moths of North America